is a waterfall in Zaō, Katta District, Miyagi Prefecture, Japan, in on the Sumikawa River. It is one of "Japan’s Top 100 Waterfalls", in a listing published by the Japanese Ministry of the Environment in 1990.

External links
   Ministry of Environment

Waterfalls of Japan
Landforms of Miyagi Prefecture
Tourist attractions in Miyagi Prefecture
Zaō, Miyagi